Vyacheslav Vyacheslavovich Danilin (born 14 March 1984) is a Russian former association football player.

Playing career
Danilin previously played for FC Moscow in the Russian Premier League and Dinaburg FC.

* - played games and goals

References

1984 births
People from Lyuberetsky District
Living people
Russian footballers
Russia under-21 international footballers
Association football midfielders
Russian expatriate footballers
FC Moscow players
FC Fakel Voronezh players
FC Daugava players
Expatriate footballers in Latvia
Russian expatriate sportspeople in Latvia
Russian Premier League players
FC Salyut Belgorod players
FC Solyaris Moscow players
FC Orenburg players
FC Veles Moscow players
Sportspeople from Moscow Oblast